Niamh Coyle is a camogie player, winner of a Soaring Star award in 2009. The Soaring Star and Roscommon player of the year awards for 2009 commemorated her achievement in helping Roscommon achieve a historic victory in the (junior) Nancy Murray Cup, coming from five points down to defeat Armagh in the final by three points. She won a Roscommon intermediate football title in 2008 with Four Roads.

References

Living people
Year of birth missing (living people)
Roscommon camogie players